The Guerreran climbing salamander (Bolitoglossa hermosa) is a species of salamander in the family Plethodontidae.
It is endemic to Mexico. It is found on the Pacific slope of the Sierra Madre del Sur in the basins of the Atoyac and Tecpan rivers, between 765 and 2,800 meters elevation. Its extent of occurrence (EOO) is 1,122 km2.

Its natural habitats are subtropical or tropical moist lowland forests, subtropical or tropical moist montane forests, plantations, and rural gardens.

It is threatened by habitat loss.

References

Bolitoglossa
Endemic amphibians of Mexico
Fauna of the Sierra Madre del Sur
Taxonomy articles created by Polbot
Amphibians described in 1984